Ayoví may refer to:
 Arlín Ayoví (born 1979),  Ecuadorian footballer
 Jaime Ayoví (born 1988),  Ecuadorian footballer
 Marlon Ayoví (born 1971),  Ecuadorian footballer
 Orlindo Ayoví (born 1984),  Ecuadorian footballer
 Walter Ayoví (born 1979),  Ecuadorian footballer
 Guillermo Ayoví Erazo (born 1930), better known as Papá Roncón, Afro-Ecuadorian musician
 José Ayoví (born 1991), Ecuadorian footballer